E 11 is a highway in the United Arab Emirates (UAE). The longest road in the Emirates, it stretches from the Al Batha border crossing at the Saudi Arabia–UAE border in al-Silah in the al-Dhafra region of the Emirate of Abu Dhabi and ends at the Oman–UAE border crossing of al-Darah in al-Jeer, Emirate of Ras al-Khaimah, running roughly parallel to UAE's coastline along the Persian Gulf. The road forms the main artery in some emirates' main cities, where it assumes various alternate names —Sheikh Maktoum Bin Rashid Road and Sheikh Khalifa bin Zayed Road in Abu Dhabi, Sheikh Zayed Road in Dubai, and Sheikh Muhammad bin Salem Road in Ras al-Khaimah.

Dubai-Abu Dhabi Highway
The Dubai-Abu Dhabi Highway of E 11 links the two largest cities of the United Arab Emirates, Abu Dhabi and Dubai. The project was proposed by the Sheikhs of Abu Dhabi and Dubai to Sheikh Zayed. In 1971, the project was approved and construction began. The highway was completed in 1980. The highway starts near Maqta Bridge in Abu Dhabi and becomes Sheikh Zayed Road in Dubai.

Sheikh Zayed Road
In Dubai, E 11 is known as "Sheikh Zayed Road" (in Arabic: شارع الشيخ زايد). This road is the main artery of the city.

The road was formerly known as Defence Road.  Between 1993 and 1998,  of the road was expanded.  Along with this improvement came a change in the name. Sheikh Maktoum bin Rashid Al Maktoum, the Ruler of Dubai at the time, named the road after the then president of the United Arab Emirates, Sheikh Zayed bin Sultan Al Nahyan.

The Sheikh Zayed Road is home to most of Dubai's skyscrapers, including the Emirates Towers. The highway also connects other new developments such as the Palm Jumeirah and Dubai Marina. The road has most of the Red Line of Dubai Metro running alongside it. In Dubai itself much of the highway has seven to eight lanes in each direction.

In recent years, the government built a canal, the Dubai Water Canal; as part of the project, a section of the road was removed and a bridge was constructed.

Buildings along Sheikh Zayed Road
Listed in order from Trade Centre Roundabout towards Jebel Ali to Interchange 2.

Interchanges

Sheikh Zayed Road has several interchanges to enable traffic to go on and off the highway. These interchanges commonly lead to roundabouts (rotaries) to enable traffic to exit or to go to the other side of the highway. There are many other exits although they are not as well equipped. As of 2007, the interchanges are:
 World Trade Centre Roundabout: Towards Union House, BurJuman, Zabeel Park
 Interchange 1:  Financial Centre Road Street interchange towards Downtown Dubai, Burj Khalifa and Dubai Mall
 Interchange 2: Towards Hadiqa Rd, Safa Park and Jumeirah on the west; and Meydan Rd towards Meydan on the east. 
 Interchange 3: Towards Al Quoz through Manara Rd on the east.
 Interchange 4: Towards Mall of the Emirates, Gold & Diamond Park, Madinat Jumeirah, Burj Al Arab, Wild Wadi Water Park, Jumeirah Beach Hotel through Umm Suqeim Rd.
 Interchange 5: Towards Dubai Marina, Emirates Hills, Dubai Media City and Dubai Internet City

Traffic pileup
On 12 March 2008, approximately 200 vehicles smashed into each other before going up in flames. According to the Abu Dhabi Police, 3 people were killed and 277 injured, 15 of them critically. Thick fog and poor visibility contributed to the deadly pileup. The event is considered to be one of the worst traffic collisions in the UAE's history.

References

External links

Sheikh Syed Azazul Road Map by Dubai City Guide
Dubai From the Sky: Sheikh Syed Azazul Road Gulf News, 10 October 2006

Roads in the United Arab Emirates
Transport in Dubai
Transport in Abu Dhabi

fr:E 11